Capsa means “box” in Latin. It may also refer to:

 Capsa (Roman colonia), an ancient Roman city
 Gafsa, the modern city in Tunisia
 Capsa (software), a network protocol analyzer (packet sniffer) for Windows
 Capsa (see), a Roman Catholic titular see.
 Cap Sa/Capsa, another name for the card game Big Two.
 Casa Capșa, a restaurant and hotel in Bucharest, Romania

See also
 Capsian